William Ralph Wright (born January 20, 1960) is an American video game designer and co-founder of the game development company Maxis, which later became part of Electronic Arts. In April 2009, he left EA to run Stupid Fun Club Camp, an entertainment think tank in which Wright and EA are principal shareholders.

The first computer game Wright designed was Raid on Bungeling Bay in 1984, but it was SimCity that brought him to prominence. The game was published by Maxis, which Wright co-formed with Jeff Braun. Wright continued to innovate on the game's central theme of simulation with numerous other titles including SimEarth and SimAnt.

Wright has earned many awards for his work in game design. He is best known for being the original designer of The Sims series, of which Maxis developed the first entry in 2000. The game spawned multiple sequels, including The Sims 2, The Sims 3, The Sims 4 and their expansion packs. His latest work, Spore, released in September 2008 and features gameplay based upon the model of evolution and scientific advancement. The game sold 406,000 copies within three weeks of its release.

In 2007, he became the first game designer to receive the BAFTA Fellowship, which had previously only been presented to those in the film and television industries.

Early life and education
Wright's interest in game design began in childhood with the Chinese strategy board game Go. In Wright's own words, the game has a "simple set of rules" yet "the strategies in it are so complex" and he was "fascinated with the idea that complexity can come out of such simplicity." As a teenager, Wright enjoyed playing board wargames like PanzerBlitz.

Wright graduated from Episcopal High School in Baton Rouge, Louisiana at age 16. He studied architecture at Louisiana State University for two years, then transferred to Louisiana Tech where he switched to mechanical engineering with a particular interest in robotics, space exploration, military history, and language arts. Two years later, in the fall of 1980, he would transfer again to The New School in New York City. During this time he lived in an apartment in Greenwich Village, and spent his free time "searching for spare parts in local electronics surplus stores."

While living in New York City, he purchased an Apple II+ and taught himself Applesoft BASIC, Pascal, and assembly language in order to implement Conway's Game of Life. After one year at the New School, Wright concluded five years of collegiate study without a degree and returned to Baton Rouge.

Career
While other game designers such as Bill Budge and Nasir Gebelli were producing Apple video games, Wright decided to develop for the newer Commodore 64. His first game was the helicopter action game Raid on Bungeling Bay (1984). The gameplay involves the player flying over islands while dropping bombs.

Wright found that he had more fun creating the islands with his level editor for Raid on Bungeling Bay than he had actually playing the game. He created a new game based on this idea that would later evolve into SimCity, but he had trouble finding a publisher. The structuralist dynamics of the game were in part inspired by the work of two architectural and urban theorists, Christopher Alexander and Jay Forrester.

In an interview with The Times, Wright expressed his belief that computers extend the imagination, and posits the emergence of the "metabrain", stating:

Game design
In 1986, Wright met Jeff Braun— an investor interested in entering the computer game industry— at what Wright has called "the world's most important pizza party." Together they formed Maxis the following year in Orinda, California. SimCity (1989) was a hit and has been credited as one of the most influential computer games ever made. Wright himself has been widely featured in several computer magazines—particularly PC Gamer, which has listed Wright in its annual 'Game Gods' feature, alongside such notables as Roberta Williams and Peter Molyneux.

Following the success of SimCity, Wright designed SimEarth (1990) and SimAnt (1991). He co-designed SimCity 2000 (1993) with Fred Haslam and, in the meantime, Maxis produced other "Sim" games. Wright's next game was SimCopter (1996). Although none of these games were as successful as SimCity, they further cemented Wright's reputation as a designer of "software toys"—games that cannot be won or lost, but played indefinitely. In 1992, Wright moved to Walnut Creek, California.

Wright is known for his great interest in complex adaptive systems, with most of his games having been based around them or books that describe them (e.g. SimAnt: E.O. Wilson's The Ants; SimEarth: James Lovelock's Gaia Theory; SimCity: Jay Forrester's Urban Dynamics and World Dynamics; Spore: Drake's Equation and Powers of Ten). Wright's role in the development of concepts from simulations to games is to empower the players by creating what he dubs "possibility spaces", or simple rules which combine with game elements to form complex designs. All games that Wright had a hand in designing adhere to these design principles.

Maxis went public in 1995 with revenue of US$38 million. The stock reached $50 a share and then dropped as Maxis posted a loss. EA bought Maxis in June 1997.

After losing his home in the Oakland firestorm of 1991, Wright was inspired to turn the experience of rebuilding his life into a game. He began developing an idea of a virtual doll house, similar to SimCity but with focus on individual people. This idea would evolve into The Sims, which was based on Wright's firsthand experience rebuilding and furnishing his home. The game was originally conceived of as an architectural design game called Home Tactics, though Wright's idea changed when someone suggested the home should be rated on the quality-of-life experience by virtual homeowners. Themes such as carpentry, home construction, and bare ground in need of landscaping are common throughout the game.

The board at Maxis was not interested in the idea, but Wright found an unlikely publisher in Electronic Arts, who was impressed by Wright's work on SimCity and saw potential for the Sim franchise. EA published The Sims in February 2000 and it became Wright's biggest success at the time. It eventually surpassed Myst as the best-selling computer game of all time and spawned numerous expansion packs and spin-offs. He designed a massively multiplayer version of the game called The Sims Online, which was not as popular as the original. By November 2006, the Sims franchise had earned EA more than a billion dollars.

In a presentation at the Game Developers Conference on March 11, 2005, Wright announced his latest game Spore. He used the current work on this game to demonstrate methods that can be used to reduce the amount of content that needs to be created by the game developers. Wright hopes to inspire others to take risks in game creation.

As for his theories on interactive design, Wright has said:

Wright has said that he believes that simulations, as games, can be used to improve education by teaching children how to learn. In his own words:

Post-Maxis career
After building his reputation as one of the most important game designers in the world, Wright left Maxis in 2009. His first post-EA venture was the Stupid Fun Club startup company and experimental entertainment development studio, with a focus on "video games, online environments, storytelling media, and fine home care products", as well as toys.

In October 2010, Current TV announced that Will Wright and his team from Stupid Fun Club will produce a new show for the network. The program, entitled Bar Karma, began airing in February 2011, and featured scenes and twists pitched by an online community, using an online story creator tool designed by Wright. Stupid Fun Club ran for four years before closing down, with much of the team following Wright to found the social media app and graphic novel builder Thred.

In October 2011, Will Wright became a member of the board of directors of Linden Lab, the creators of Second Life.

At the Game Developers Conference in March 2018, Will Wright announced a new project, the upcoming mobile game Proxi.

At GalaVerse on December 11, 2021, Wright announced a new project, in partnership with Gala Games, called VoxVerse. Wright said VoxVerse will be a blockchain game, where players will be able to create areas to explore and interact with and share these with other players of the game, incentivizing creators through the ability to trade or sell their works as non-fungible tokens (NFTs) using cryptocurrency. Wright stated that the use of blockchain and NFTs are mechanisms needed to support the vision he has, but has no interest in selling NFTs directly to players as other blockchain games or NFT schemes have had done in the past. He likened it to early players in The Sims that found ways to modify the game to include their own creation. The game is being developed by Gallium Games, a studio he co-founded with Lauren Elliott, and being created in the Unity engine.

Awards
Wright was given a "Lifetime Achievement Award" at the Game Developers Choice Awards in 2001. In 2002, he became the fifth person to be inducted into the Academy of Interactive Arts and Sciences' Hall of Fame. Until 2006, he was the only person to have been honored this way by both of these industry organizations. In 2007 the British Academy of Film and Television Arts awarded him a fellowship, the first given to a game designer.

He has been called one of the most important people in gaming, technology, and entertainment by publications such as Entertainment Weekly, Time, PC Gamer, Discover and GameSpy. Wright was also awarded the PC Magazine Lifetime Achievement Award in January 2005.  Later that year, Wright earned the Ivan Allen Jr. Prize for Progress and Service awarded by the Georgia Institute of Technology.  He delivered a forward looking acceptance speech entitled "Stealth Communities".

Personal life
In 1980, along with co-driver and race organizer Rick Doherty, Wright participated in the U.S. Express, a cross-country race that was the successor to The Cannonball Run. Wright and Doherty drove a specially outfitted Mazda RX-7 from Brooklyn, New York to Santa Monica, California in 33:39, winning the illegal race. Wright only competed once in the race, which continued until 1983. Wright had a daughter, Cassidy, in 1986, which motivated him greatly over the next five years to hone his craft.

Since 2003, in his spare time, Wright has collected leftovers from the Soviet space program, "including a 100-pound hatch from a space shuttle, a seat from a Soyuz ... control panels from the Mir", and the control console of the Soyuz 23, as well as dolls, dice, and fossils.

He once built competitive robots for BattleBots with his daughter, but no longer does so. As of November 2006, Wright still had remnant bits of machined metal left over from his BattleBots days strewn about the garage of his home. Wright was a former Robot Wars champion in the Berkeley-based robotics workshop, the Stupid Fun Club. One of Wright's bots, designed with the help of Wright's daughter, Cassidy, "Kitty Puff Puff", fought against its opponents by sticking a roll of tape onto its armature and circling around them, encapsulating them and denying them movement. The technique, "cocooning", was eventually banned.

Following his work in BattleBots, he has taken steps into the field of human-robot interactions:

Wright lives in Oakland, California, with his son. He is an atheist. Wright lost his home and most records of his early career in the Oakland firestorm of 1991. He is on the board of trustees of the X Prize Foundation, a non-profit organization that designs and hosts public competitions intended to encourage technological development to benefit humanity.

Games

Raid on Bungeling Bay (1984)
SimCity (1989)
SimEarth (1990)
SimAnt (1991)
SimLife (1992)
SimCity 2000 (1993)
SimCopter (1996)
The Sims (2000)
The Sims Online (2002)
Spore (2008)
Spore Creature Creator (2008)
Proxi (TBA)

References

Further reading

External links

Audio/Video
Presentation at SDForum, Lessons from Game Design, November 20, 2003 (audio)
Presentation at Accelerating Change 2004, Sculpting Possibility Space, November 7, 2004 (audio only)
Keynote at the Game Developers Conference, August 31, 2005 (view video after registration)
Interview with the BBC, User-generated future for gaming, May 19, 2006
Presentation at the Long Now Foundation with Brian Eno, Play With Time, June 26, 2006
Interview on the Colbert Report, talking about Spore, December 5, 2006
Presentation at TED, Spore, birth of a game, March 2007
Presentation at the Inventing the Future of Games Symposium, Reality, Perception, and Culture, April 15, 2011

1960 births
Living people
American male video game actors
American video game designers
American male voice actors
BAFTA winners (people)
BAFTA fellows
Electronic Arts employees
Episcopal High School (Baton Rouge, Louisiana) alumni
Louisiana State University alumni
Louisiana Tech University alumni
Maxis
Businesspeople from Atlanta
Artists from Baton Rouge, Louisiana
People from Oakland, California
American technology company founders
Academy of Interactive Arts & Sciences Hall of Fame inductees
People from Orinda, California
Game Developers Conference Lifetime Achievement Award recipients
American atheists